Harry Hartman (born March 7, 1937) is a American former college football player and coach. He served as the head football coach at Salem International University in Salem, West Virginia in 1965 and was an assistant at that school from 1966 to 1976.

References

External links
 Salem International Hall of Fame profile

1937 births
Living people
Salem Tigers football coaches
Salem Tigers football players